Sara Osuna Acedo (born 1958) has a PhD in Philosophy and Education Sciences by Spain's Universidad Nacional de Educación a Distancia (UNED).

Career
At UNED, she is a Professor of Communication and Education, teaching on Pedagogics and Social Education undergraduate programs. Her expertise mainly focuses on digital technologies, Communication Models and eLearning.

Her main lines of research are MOOCs, Media convergence, Digital scenarios, Disability, eLearning and Social Media. She actively collaborates with a number of European and Latin-American universities on several projects about collaborative learning and communicational models. 
She has coordinated during three year-long (2014–17),  EC-funded (ECO)(Elearning, Communication and Open-data: Mobile, Massive and Ubiquitous Learning),. This project was developed between 2014 and 2017, and in which 22 partners from nine different countries participated.

In addition, she holds a master's degree on Integrated Technologies and Knowledge society, as well as credited diplomas as University expert on Free Software (UNED), University Expert on Media Analysis (UNED), and University specialist on Integrated Communication Systems (UNED).

Publications 
Sara Osuna Acedo has written more than 50 publications such as books, chapters and reviews in journals:
 Osuna-Acedo, S.; Gil-Quintana, J. (2017) «El proyecto europeo ECO. Rompiendo barreras en el acceso al conocimiento». Educación XX1, 20
 Osuna-Acedo, S.; Frau-Meigs, D.; Camarero-Cano, L.; Pedrosa, R. (2017) «Intercreativity and Interculturality in the Virtual Learning Environments of the ECO MOOC Project». Open Education: from OERs to MOOCs: 161-187
 Osuna-Acedo, S.; Tejera-Osuna, S.M. (2016) «ECO European project: inclusive education through accessible MOOCs». Proceedings of the Fourth International Conference on Technological Ecosystems for Enhancing Multiculturality
 Cantillo-Valero, C.; Osuna-Acedo, S. (2016) «Brumas y claros en el dibujo animado». Proceedings of the Fourth International Conference on Technological Ecosystems for Enhancing Multiculturality. Opción , 32, 7:333-357
Gil-Quintana, J.; Camarero-Cano, L.; Cantillo-Valero, C.; Osuna-Acedo, S. (2016) «sMOOC and Gamification–A Proposed Ubiquitous Learning». International Symposium on Emerging Technologies for Education: 507-513
Camarero-Cano, L.; Osuna-Acedo, S. (2016) «Intercreativity And Smooc. The Importance Of The Collective Intelligence In The ECO European Project». International Educational Technology Conference (IETC 2016): 443-452
 Osuna-Acedo, S.; Escaño-González, C. (2016) «CMOOC: transitando caminos educomunicativos hacia el conocimiento democratizado, abierto y común». Revista Mediterránea de Comunicación/Mediterranean Journal of Communication ...: 443-452
 Marta-Lazo, C.; Gabelas-Barroso, J. A.; Osuna-Acedo, S. (2016) «Comunicación digital: un modelo basado en el Factor R-elacional». UOC

References

External links 
 Sara Osuna Acedo - Docente de la Facultad de Educación
 Proyecto Europeo ECOLearning
 Sara Osuna-Acedo-Google Scholar (http://orcid.org/0000-0002-5454-6215)
 Registros bibliográficos alojados en Dialnet

1958 births
Living people
Spanish educators
Spanish women educators